KTSU (90.9 FM), known as "The Choice", is a variety radio station based on the campus of Texas Southern University. It was founded on June 23, 1972.

Its studios have been located on campus at the Center for Professional Media Studies since 2005, and the station's transmitter is located nearby, also on campus.

External links
 KTSU official website
 
 
 

TSU
Jazz radio stations in the United States
TSU
Radio stations established in 1972
Texas Southern University